The  is a full-size luxury SUV sold in North American and Eurasian markets by Lexus, a luxury division of Toyota. The GX is based on the Toyota Land Cruiser Prado, from which it derives its off-road capability. Lexus introduced the first generation, known as the GX 470 in 2002, and subsequently became the third SUV to enter the Lexus lineup. A full-time four-wheel drive system is standard with low-range gearing. The 4.7-liter V8 engine in the GX 470 was the same as used on the larger LX 470. The firm next introduced the second-generation model in 2009, badged GX 460 to reflect the switch to a 4.6-liter V8 engine. Lexus later released a lower displacement GX 400 in 2012 for the Chinese market, with a 4.0-liter V6 engine.

In the Lexus lineup, the GX is positioned between the RX crossover and the LX SUV (the Lexus-badged Land Cruiser). All GX production has occurred at the Tahara plant in Japan, alongside the Land Cruiser Prado and the export-minded Toyota 4Runner.



First generation (J120; 2002) 

Lexus introduced the GX 470 at the North American International Auto Show in January 2002 as a 2003 model, with sales commencing in November 2002. The GX development program began in 1999 following the J120 Toyota Land Cruiser Prado in 1997, with design work by Shoichi Fujiyoshi concluding in the first half of 2000. The suspension shared its layout with the Toyota 4Runner equipped with the rear air suspension, while adding Adaptive Variable Suspension (AVS) and Downhill Assist Control (DAC). AVS could adjust damper firmness continuously while DAC modulated descents down slopes. Ground clearance measured , with an approach angle of 30° and a departure angle of 29° raised (25° normal).

The interior came equipped with two rows of seating, while an optional third row allowed up to eight passengers to be carried. However, the folding third row was tight with only  of legroom.  A Mark Levinson audio system along with a Rear Seat Entertainment System were available as options. A side-opening rear tailgate was standard.

In 2003, for the 2004 model year, the GX 470's transmission was upgraded to a sealed unit with no dipstick. An optional Kinetic Dynamic Suspension System (KDSS) became available as a late-year addition. KDSS freed and adjusted the vehicle's stabilizer bars for greater articulation allowing the wheels to move with less restriction over uneven terrain, and used front and rear hydraulic pressure-sensing valves and larger stabilizer bars to reduce body roll during on-road conditions. Safety upgrades for 2004 included a roll-sensing feature for the side curtain airbags, a tire pressure monitoring system, and an optional rear backup camera system.

This allowed the SUV to be certified as an Ultra-Low Emission Vehicle II (ULEV II) in the U.S. Other upgrades included an enhanced navigation system, Bluetooth compatibility, and more voice commands. A Sport model joined the lineup, including the Kinetic Dynamic Suspension System and different styling such as smoked bezel headlamps, added chrome trim, and black birdseye maple wood.

For 2007, the GX 470 was largely unchanged, with upgrades for cabin electronics including a new generation navigation system, auxiliary input jack for devices like an iPod, DVD video playback when parked, and larger optional rear entertainment video screen.

Finally, in 2007, for the 2008 model year, the GX 470 received styling updates, including a dark metallic grille, liquid graphite wheels, added exterior and interior chrome, revised turn signal lights, and added wood and body color options.

The Lexus GX has won various awards including "Four Wheeler of the Year" in 2003 and 2004 from Four Wheeler Magazine, and Automobile Magazine All-Star for 2003 in the Mid-Size Sport-Utility category. J.D. Power and Associates named the GX 470 the highest ranked premium luxury SUV in initial quality in 2005, and Kelley Blue Book gave the GX 470 its Best Resale Value Award in 2006.

Second generation (J150; 2009) 

The GX 460 debuted in China at the Guangzhou International Automobile Exhibition in November 2009. The redesigned model continued with body-on-frame construction, full-time four-wheel drive, an electronically controlled hi-lo transfer case, and a Torsen center locking differential. The Kinetic Dynamic Suspension System (KDSS) became standard. The rear wiper was hidden under the rear spoiler, and while the tailgate remained side-opening, a flip-up glass panel was added.

The interior added a power-folding, two-passenger third row which folded flat, allowing capacity for up to seven passengers, with the second row sliding or tilting for third-row access. Because the third row was no longer removable and used additional space, cargo capacity declined. A toggle switch replaced the transfer case's floor-mounted shift lever, and the gauge cluster added a steering wheel angle display for off-road situations. Similar to before, a Mark Levinson sound system and two-display Rear Seat Entertainment System (RSES) were optional, while three-zone climate control, semi-aniline leather, and heated second-row seats and steering wheel were new options.

Like its predecessor, Rear Adjustable Height Control (AHC) air suspension was offered on the GX 460 with an Adaptive Variable Suspension (AVS) system and Hill-start Assist Control (HAC). Additional electronic aids included the LX 570's Crawl Control system, Downhill Assist Control (DAC), and Active Traction Control (A-TRAC). The Torsen differential distributed a variable torque split when left unlocked, including a 40:60 (front: rear) ratio under normal driving conditions, a 30:70 ratio during cornering, and a 50:50 ratio when rear-wheel slippage was detected.

Added safety features included whiplash-reducing active headrests and ten airbags, including front knee airbags and rear side torso airbags. New safety options include a Pre-Collision System, Driver Monitoring System, lane departure warning system, and Lexus Enform with Safety Connect telematics. Optional cameras located at the rear door, rear-view mirror, and passenger-side mirror provided views of the vehicle's sides. Low-beam HID headlamp projectors were offered with an Intelligent High Beam feature which automatically dimmed the high beams depending on traffic conditions and an Adaptive Front lighting System (AFS) that swiveled the headlamps in corners.

On May 28, 2012, Lexus China announced the market launch of the GX 400, which replaces the GX 460 in China. The engine option is now changed to the 4.0-liter 1GR-FE V6 engine that outputs  combined with a five-speed automatic transmission. Compared with the outgoing GX 460, most standard equipment on GX 400 remains the same. However, in November 2017, the GX 400 was discontinued in Chinese markets.

On April 13, 2010, Consumer Reports in the United States urged customers not to buy the 2010 model year GX 460, giving it a "Don't buy, Safety Risk" label, its first such vehicle rating since 2001, following the results of a "lift-off oversteer" emergency test. This label was lifted on May 7, 2010. In the high-speed test, the SUV was quickly turned with no pedal input, causing a sideways slide before the vehicle stability control (VSC) initiated a full stop. Consumer Reports said that the VSC acted too slowly, and if a wheel hit a curb or slid off the pavement, a rollover accident could occur. The shared platform Toyota 4Runner passed the test, and while Consumer Reports said it knew of no actual incidents, it recommended a software fix. The same day, vehicle maker Toyota expressed concern, thanked the magazine, and temporarily suspended GX 460 sales. While noting that the SUV met all U.S. federal requirements, on April 16 Toyota confirmed that its testing had duplicated the results.

On April 19, 2010, a voluntary recall of the GX 460 was issued, along with the left-hand-drive Land Cruiser Prado, for a software update to fix the VSC response. With the software update in place, sales resumed on April 29. Vehicle stability control had been criticized by Wheels magazine for slow response speed on such models as the Toyota Kluger (known as the Highlander in North America), while Drive noted that VSC had also been said to intervene too soon. The Wall Street Journal pointed the lack of VSC a decade ago.

In September 2013, the GX received a first facelift with the Lexus spindle grille design, new LED headlamps, and LED daytime running lights standard; LED fog lamps are optional.  In the US pricing has been reduced by $4,750.

Yearly changes 
 2016, for the 2017 model year: the Lexus GX added second-row captain chairs with the luxury package.

 2019, for the 2020 model year: the GX received a second facelift with a redesigned, more angular spindle grille along with new triple-beam LED headlamps. An Off-Road package is also new, which consists of a 360-degree Panoramic View Monitor and Multi-Terrain Monitor with 4 Cameras, a transmission cooler, a fuel-tank protector along with Lexus' own Crawl Control and Multi-Terrain Select. Additionally, the interior gains new trim options, and safety features part of Safety System+ are now standard on all models.

 2021, for the 2022 model year: the GX received some minor changes, one of which included a new infotainment system with both Apple CarPlay and Android Auto and a redesigned dashboard.

 2022, for the 2023 model year: the Black Line Special Edition was added.

Engines

Sales 
Sales data for the Lexus GX are as follows, sourced from manufacturer yearly data:

References

External links 

 

Toyota Land Cruiser
GX
Luxury sport utility vehicles
Full-size sport utility vehicles
All-wheel-drive vehicles
Cars introduced in 2002
2010s cars
2020s cars